Miantso  is a town in Analamanga Region, in the  Central Highlands of Madagascar, located north-west from the capital of Antananarivo.

The town is linked by the  RNT 36 in bad state of conservation to Antananarivo, via Ampanotokana and  Mahitsy.

Commune
12 villages belong to the Fokontany (village) of Miantso:

Fokontany (village)  Surface (km2)
ANTSAMPANIMAHAZO - 9,61 km2
TAFAINA - 23,78
FKT FENOSOA  - 23,00
MANDROSORASAHA - 14,87
TALATA AVARADRANO - 35,86
ANDRIATEIARA - 8,17
ANDRAISO - 5,33
MIANTSO - 10,56
MANDRIANKENIHENY - 20,91
SOAVINA - 22,53
AVARATRAMBATO - 10,69
ANDREFAMBATO - 10,06
TOTAL 195,37 km2

References

Populated places in Analamanga